The Ministry of Defence (Wazarat-e-Difa, abbreviated as MoD), is an executive ministry of the Government of Pakistan, tasked in defending Pakistan's national interests and values at home and abroad. It plays a major supporting role to the Pakistan Armed Forces and coordinates with a range of domestic, foreign and inter-governmental bodies.

The existence and functions of the ministry are statutorily defined in Part XII, Chapter II of the Constitution of Pakistan. The responsibilities for procurement, production and disposal of equipment were transferred in 2004 to the Ministry of Defence Production. The Ministry of Defence is one of the largest federal ministries of the Government of Pakistan in terms of budget as well as staff.

Hierarchy

The Minister of Defence is Cabinet member, who is responsible for controlling the armed forces. The current Minister of Defence is Khawaja Muhammad Asif. The Secretary of Defence is the senior-most administrative figure within the ministry, who in recent decades has typically been a retired three-star Pakistani army general. The assistant secretaries serving under him are serving flag-officers belonging to the respective services. The following is a simplified representation of the MoD's senior leadership:
Minister of Defence (political head)
Secretary of Defence (administrative head)
Assistant Secretary I (Army)
Joint Secretary I (Army)
Joint Secretary III (Coordination)
Assistant Secretary II (Admin / PAF)
Joint Secretary V (Budgets & Public Accounts Committee)
Joint Secretary VII (Air Force)
Assistant Secretary III (Navy)
Joint Secretary II (Navy & Maritime)
Joint Secretary IV (Inter-Services)

History
The Ministry of Defence is a successor of the Military Department created by the British East India Company in Calcutta in 1776. Its main function was to coordinate and record orders, relating to the Army, issued by various Departments of the Government of the East India Company. The Military Department initially functioned as a branch of the Public Department and maintained a list of Army personnel. Following Pakistan's independence in 1947, the Ministry of Defence was established at Karachi in August of that year, with Prime Minister Liaquat Ali Khan also holding the Minister of Defence, while Iskander Mirza served as Defence Secretary. British flag officers remained commanders-in-chief of the army, navy and air force in Pakistan until 1956. In December 1959, the federal capital shifted temporarily to Rawalpindi, while plans for Islamabad were drawn up by then-General Ayub Khan's military government. The proximity of the Army Headquarters in Rawalpindi played a major role in the decision to relocate the capital. In March 1972, President Zulfiqar Ali Bhutto in response to criticism over the difficulties in inter-service coordination in previous wars decreed that all service HQs were to move to Islamabad. The Navy was the first to comply, with Naval Headquarters moving from Karachi to Sector E9 Islamabad 1974, while Air Headquarters moved from Peshawar to Sector E10 Islamabad in 1983. Following two failed assassination attempts in Rawalpindi, President Pervez Musharraf restarted plans in 2004 for the entire defence establishment to shift to Sector E10 in Islamabad where the Ministry of Defence along with the four service headquarters would be based. This was subsequently cancelled in 2008 grounds of cost following Musharraf's forced resignation. The Ministry of Defence is presently located at "Calcutta House" in Rawalpindi. Other related top-level head offices based in Rawalpindi include the Ministry of Defence Production (MoDP), Joint Staff Headquarters and the Army General Headquarters. The Air Headquarters and the Naval Headquarters are located in Islamabad.

Organization
The following organizations and services are under the Ministry of Defence:
 Joint Chiefs of Staff Committee (JCSC)
 Inter Services Public Relations (ISPR)
 Inter Services Selection Board (ISSB)
 National Defence University (NDU)
 Strategic Plans Division (SPD)
National Engineering and Scientific Commission (NESCOM) 
 Defence Science and Technology Organisation (DESTO)
Air Weapons Complex (AWC) 
National Defence Complex (NDC)
Kahuta Research Laboratories (KRL)
Military Engineering Services (MES)
 Inter-Services Intelligence Directorate (ISI)
Pakistan Army
National Guard
Frontier Works Organisation
Pakistan Air Force
Pakistan Navy
Pakistan Marines
Pakistan Maritime Security Agency
Pakistan Armed Services Board (PASB)
Military Accounts Department
Military Lands and Cantonments Department (MLCD)
 Survey of Pakistan
 Many of Pakistan's paramilitary organisations such as the Rangers, GB Scouts, Frontier Corps and Coast Guards although officered and operationally directed by the Pakistan Army are administered and paid for by the Ministry of the Interior.
 The Special Communications Organization (SCO) is administratively part of the Ministry of Information Technology and Telecommunication but is maintained by Pakistan Army Corps of Signals. It was established in July 1976 with the mission of providing telecommunication services for civil government and the general population in AJK and Gilgit-Baltistan
 In 2013 the Airports Security Force (ASF), Pakistan International Airlines (PIA) and Civil Aviation Authority (CAA) were transferred from the MoD to the newly formed Aviation Division of the Cabinet Secretariat. Overseen by a senior civil servant it is ultimately answerable to the Prime Minister.
 The MoD's Defence Production Division was established in 1972 by President Zulfiqar Ali Bhutto which absorbed existing facilities such as Pakistan Ordnance Factories (POF) as well as overseeing the establishment of enterprises such as Heavy Industries Taxila  (HIT) and Pakistan Aeronautical Complex (PAC). In 2004 under President Pervez Musharraf the division was upgraded to a separate Ministry of Defence Production (MoDP).
 Following the establishment of the National Command Authority (NCA) in February 2000 the Strategic Plans Division (SPD) oversees the security of enterprises involved in research, development and production related to Pakistan's nuclear deterrent including the Pakistan Atomic Energy Commission (PAEC), the Ministry of Science & Technology (MoST)  and the MoDP.

See also

Ministry of the Interior
Ministry of Defence Production
Ministry of Science & Technology
Ministry of Information Technology and Telecommunication
Ministry of Maritime Affairs(Pakistan)
Pakistan Atomic Energy Commission
National Command Authority

References

External links 
 MoD official website

1947 establishments in Pakistan
Pakistan
Defence
Defence

Government agencies established in 1947
Ministries established in 1947